The short-nosed bandicoots (genus Isoodon) are members of the order Peramelemorphia. These marsupials can be found across Australia, although their distribution can be patchy. Genetic evidence suggests that short-nosed bandicoots diverged from the related long-nosed species around eight million years ago, during the Miocene epoch, and underwent a rapid diversification around three million years ago, during the late Pliocene.

Species and subspecies
While the IUCN lists only three species in this genus, as many as five species in this genus with the two subspecies of I. obesulus raised to full species.
Golden bandicoot, Isoodon auratus
Northern brown bandicoot, Isoodon macrourus
Southern brown bandicoot, Isoodon obesulus
Quenda or Western brown bandicoot, Isoodon obesulus fusciventer
Cape York brown bandicoot, Isoodon obesulus peninsulae

References

Peramelemorphs
Marsupials of Australia
Miocene marsupials
Miocene Oceania
Extant Miocene first appearances
Taxa named by Anselme Gaëtan Desmarest